Hoplosternum magdalenae is a species of catfish of the family Callichthyidae.  It is found west of the Andes, in the Lake Maracaibo basin in Venezuela, and in the drainages of Sinu River and Magdalena River in Colombia.

References 
 

Callichthyidae
Fish of Venezuela
Freshwater fish of Colombia
Magdalena River
Taxa named by Carl H. Eigenmann
Fish described in 1913